David Rosenfelt is an author who has written thirty-three novels and three TV movies. The main character in most of his mystery books is Andy Carpenter, attorney and dog lover.

Biography
Rosenfelt graduated from New York University and then decided to work in the movie business. After being interviewed by his uncle, who was the President of United Artists, he was hired and worked his way up the corporate culture.
Rosenfelt eventually became the marketing president for Tri-Star Pictures. He married and had two children during this period.

Rosenfelt left the corporate industry and wrote screenplays for movies and television. He turned to writing novels and has become quite successful in that genre.
In 1995, he and his wife started the "Tara Foundation" which has saved almost 4,000 dogs. He is a dog lover and supports more than two dozen dogs.

Style
Rosenfelt, who is a dog lover and who has worked with many lawyers in his occupation, created the character Andy Carpenter, an attorney who faces corporate cultures and who is a dog lover.

Format
Rosenfelt books run in the low to mid 300 pages with 15 basic beats and about 40 scenes fairly consistent with movie and television formats.

Books

Standalone Fiction 

Don't Tell A Soul, 2008, Minotaur Books, 
Down to the Wire, 2010, Minotaur Books, 
On Borrowed Time, 2011, Minotaur Books, 
Heart of a Killer, 2012, Minotaur Books, 
Airtight, 2013, Minotaur Books, 
Without Warning, 2014, Minotaur Books,

Andy Carpenter series
Open and Shut, 2002, Grand Central Publishing  
Finalist for the Edgar Award and the Shamus Award for best first novel.
First Degree, 2003, Grand Central Publishing, 
Bury the Lead, 2004, Grand Central Publishing  
Selection of the NBC Today Book Club.
Sudden Death, 2005, Mysterious Press, 
Dead Center, 2006, Mysterious Press, 
Play Dead, 2007, Grand Central Publishing, 
New Tricks, 2009, Grand Central Publishing, 
Dog Tags, 2010, Grand Central Publishing, 
One Dog Night, 2011, Minotaur Books, 
Leader of the Pack, 2012, Minotaur Books, 
Unleashed, 2013, Minotaur Books, 
Hounded, 2014, Minotaur Books, 
Who Let the Dog Out?, 2015, Minotaur Books, 
Outfoxed, 2016, Minotaur Books, 
The Twelve Dogs of Christmas, 2017, Minotaur Books, 
Collared, 2017, Minotaur Books, 
Rescued, 2018, Minotaur Books, 
Deck the Hounds, 2018, Minotaur Books, 
Bark of Night, 2019, Minotaur Books, 
Dachshund Through the Snow, 2019, Minotaur Books, 
Muzzled, 2020, Minotaur Books, 
Silent Bite, 2020, Minotaur Books, 
Dog Eat Dog, 2021, Minotaur Books, 
Best In Snow, 2021, Minotaur Books, 
Holy Chow, 2022, Minotaur Books, ISBN 9781250828873
Santa's Little Yelpers, 2022, Minotaur Books,

The K Team 
Andy Carpenter spinoff series.

 The K Team, 2020, Minotaur Books, 
Animal Instinct, 2021, Minotaur Books, ISBN 9781250257208
Citizen K-9, 2022, Minotaur Books, ISBN 9781250828934

Doug Brock series
Blackout, 2016, Minotaur Books, 
Fade to Black, 2018, Minotaur Books, 
Black and Blue, 2019, Minotaur Books,

Nonfiction 

 Dogtripping: 25 Rescues, 11 Volunteers, and 3 RVs on Our Canine Cross-Country Adventure, 2013, St. Martin's Press, 
 Lessons from Tara: Life Advice from the World’s Most Brilliant Dog, 2015, St. Martin's Press,

Articles
 "Whatever You Do, Don't Kill the Dog"
 "Integrity and Humility"

References

External links
Sample review of Leader of the Pack, 2012
Tara Foundation
David Rosenfelt webpage

Living people
21st-century American novelists
American male novelists
Writers from Paterson, New Jersey
American television writers
American male television writers
American male screenwriters
21st-century American male writers
Novelists from New Jersey
Screenwriters from New Jersey
Year of birth missing (living people)
21st-century American screenwriters